WJAQ (100.9 FM) is a radio station licensed to serve Marianna, Florida, United States.  The station is owned by MFR, Inc.

It broadcasts a country music format previously featuring the "Today's Best Country" satellite-delivered format from Westwood One. Now currently playing from a licensed catalog of Todays Best Country music.

Shows include "The Auction Block" produced in studio as well as Business News and after show Podcast covering the local news of the business community and events of Jackson County Florida.

References

External links

JAQ
Country radio stations in the United States
1964 establishments in Florida
Radio stations established in 1964